Ripening Youth may refer to:
 Ripening Youth (1955 film), a West German drama film
 Ripening Youth (1933 film), a German drama film